Avis is Latin for bird and may refer to:

Aviation
Auster Avis, a 1940s four-seat light aircraft developed from the Auster Autocrat (abandoned project)
Avro Avis, a two-seat biplane
Scottish Aeroplane Syndicate Avis, an early aircraft built by Howard Wright

Businesses
Avis Budget Group
Avis Car Rental

Places
Avis, Portugal, a municipality in the south of Portugal
Avis, Ohio, United States, an unincorporated community
Avis, Pennsylvania, United States, a borough

Other uses
Avis (name), a given name and a surname
Andover Village Improvement Society, a land preservation society
Associazione Volontari Italiani Sangue, or AVIS, an Italian blood donation organisation
Avis Dam, a dam near Windhoek, Namibia
USS Avis (Sp-382), a United States Navy patrol boat in commission from 1917 to 1918
Menton J. Matthews III or Avis, musician
Avis, an open-source implementation of the Elvin network event routing specification
Avis, a fictional deity on The Orville
-avis, a commonly used taxonomic suffix

See also
Aves (disambiguation)
Avi (disambiguation)
Aviz (disambiguation)
House of Aviz or House of Avis, a dynasty of the kings of Portugal
List of newspapers named Avis
Order of Aviz (Brazil) or Imperial Order of St. Benedict of Avis, a former Imperial Brazilian military order